Idoia Mendia Cueva (born 1965 in Bilbao) is a Spanish politician and since 2014 general secretary of the Socialist Party of the Basque Country–Basque Country Left. Since 2020, she serves as the Second Vice President and the Regional Minister of Labour of Employment in the Basque Government led by Iñigo Urkullu. Previously, from 2009 to 2012, she was the Regional Minister of Interior, Justice and Public Administration, and spokesperson of the Basque Government led by Patxi López.

References

1965 births
Living people
Politicians from Bilbao
Basque women in politics
Members of the 7th Basque Parliament
Members of the 8th Basque Parliament
Members of the 9th Basque Parliament
Members of the 10th Basque Parliament
Members of the 11th Basque Parliament
Members of the 12th Basque Parliament
Government ministers of the Basque Country (autonomous community)
Leaders of political parties in Spain
Municipal councillors in the Basque Country (autonomous community)
Women members of the Basque Parliament
University of Amsterdam alumni
Spanish women lawyers